Jim Haynes OAM is an Australian writer, entertainer, broadcaster, humorist, songwriter and historian. In 2016 he received a Medal of the Order of Australia for service to the performing arts.

Education/Career

The son of British migrants, Haynes was born in Sydney and attended  Sydney Boys High School and  Sydney Teachers College and later gained two master's degrees in literature, from  New England University and the  University of Wales. He sang in a folk trio at Teachers’ College and was a member of various bands while teaching in country towns, in between several periods living in the UK.

While teaching in  Inverell, NSW, in the late 1970s, Jim formed the Bandy Bill & Co Bush Band. He rejoined in 1985 and the band recorded two albums on the Hadley label and had airplay on the ABC radio show Australia All Over. Jim worked weekend shifts on commercial radio station 2NZ, began providing stories and poetry readings for "Australia All Over" and quit teaching to work full-time on that program in 1988. He had a minor hit with "Mow Ya Lawn" in 1989 and signed his first solo record deal with Festival's Kookaburra Label in 1990.

He embarked on a career as an entertainer, performing at clubs and touring a school show called ‘Singabout Australia’. His break came when Warner/Chappell Music signed him to a publishing deal and two songs from his album It's Nothing Serious, produced by Greg Champion, became hits. "Don't Call Wagga Wagga Wagga", recorded with Champion and  Ted Egan, was a number 2 hit in 1994 and "Since Cheryl Went Feral" topped the country charts for 5 weeks in 1995.

Haynes signed a three-record deal with ABC Music and began touring his own show and also touring with other artists like  Slim Dusty,  Adam Brand,  Melinda Schneider,  Greg Champion and  Beccy Cole. He has since recorded quite a few albums of songs, verse and humour on his own label Singabout Australia.

A double CD of old material, The Complete Jim Haynes Collection, was released in 2011 and an album of new songs, Galah Occasion, appeared in 2012, featuring duets with  Wayne Horsburgh and Melanie Dyer.

Having 'invented' the perfect country town of Weelabarabak in the 1980s, Haynes began writing verse about the town and its characters and events. These poems were self-published as I'll Have Chips! which sold over 10 000 copies. A book of short stories, Memories of Weelabarabak, followed - published by ABC Books.

Haynes’ Aussie Verse column was a weekly feature of the nation's oldest magazine Australasian Post, until its demise in 2004. He has now written, compiled and edited twenty books, including The Book of Australian Popular Rhymed Verse, which contains 1000 poems from early colonial days to the present and The Big Book of Verse for Aussie Kids - which contains over 600 rhymed poems.

Haynes is also credited with starting morning shows at the  Tamworth Country Music Festival, having set up the very first ’bush verse’ morning show in 1989. His Big Bush Brekky Variety Show has been a feature of the Festival for almost twenty years. Jim was inducted into the Australian Country Music Hands of Fame in 1997.  He also helped establish the Australian Bush Laureate Awards for recorded and published verse and the Stone The Crows Festival in Wagga Wagga which recognises the talents of Grey Nomads with the annual GReyVee Awards. He also regularly hosts ‘Verse, History and Country Music’ trips to Norfolk Island to coincide with the Norfolk Island Country Music Festival.

Haynes served on the board of the  Country Music Association of Australia for fifteen years, was involved in the very successful Academy of Australian Country Music and still runs the Academy course for the parents of young talented performers.

Haynes continues to work in radio, presenting the weekend Australiana segment on  Radio 2UE’s George and Paul Show and spends much of his time writing and editing collections of Australian verse and prose.

Books by Jim Haynes
 I'll Have Chips - (Singabout Australia)
 Memories of Weelabarabak - Stories of a Bush Town (ABC Books)
 An Australian Heritage of Verse  (ABC Books)
 The Great Australian Book of Limericks  (ABC Books)
 An Australian Treasury of Popular Verse  (ABC Books)
 Great Australian Drinking Stories  (ABC Books)
 All Aboard – Tales of Australian Railways  (ABC Books)
 Cobbers – Stories of Gallipoli 1915  (ABC Books)
 Great Australian Racing Stories  (ABC Books)
 Great Australian Aviation Stories  (ABC Books)
 The Book of Australian Popular Rhymed Verse  (ABC Books)
 The ABC Book of Australian Country Music  (ABC/Harper Collins)
 The Big Book of Verse for Aussie Kids  (Allen & Unwin)
 On All Fronts - Australia's WW2  (Harper Collins/ABC)
 Best Australian Racing Stories (Allen & Unwin)
 The Great Australian Book of Limericks 2nd Edition (Allen & Unwin)
 Best Australian Trucking Stories (Allen & Unwin)
 Best Australian Sea Stories (Allen & Unwin)
 Australia's Best Unknown Stories (Allen & Unwin)
Australia's Most Unbelievable True Stories (Allen & Unwin)
The Best Australian Bush Stories (Allen & Unwin)
Adventurers, Pioneers and Misfits: Australia's Most Amazing True Life Stories (Allen & Unwin)

Awards

Tamworth Songwriters Awards
The Tamworth Songwriters Association (TSA) is an annual songwriting contest for original country songs, awarded in January at the Tamworth Country Music Festival. They commenced in 1986. Jim Haynes has won five awards.
 (wins only)
|-
| 1995
| "Weelabarabak for Me" by Jim Haynes
| Comedy/ Novelty Song of the Year
| 
|-
| 1996
| "Don't Call Wagga Wagga, Wagga" by Greg Champion and Jim Haynes
| Comedy/ Novelty Song of the Year
| 
|-
| 1997
| "Since Cheryl Went Feral" by Roger Corbett and Jim Haynes
| Comedy/ Novelty Song of the Year
| 
|-
| 1999
| "The Video Song" by Rita and Mary Schneider and Jim Haynes
| Comedy/ Novelty Song of the Year
| 
|-
| 2005
| "My Grandad" by Michael Carr and Jim Haynes
| Comedy/ Novelty Song of the Year
| 
|-

References

External links 

 

21st-century Australian writers
Writers from Sydney
Australian people of British descent
People educated at Sydney Boys High School
Alumni of the University of Wales
Living people
Year of birth missing (living people)